Becenti is a census-designated place (CDP) in McKinley County, New Mexico, United States, on the Navajo Nation. It was first listed as a CDP prior to the 2020 census.

The community is in the northern part of the county, less than a mile west of New Mexico State Road 371, part of the Trail of the Ancients Scenic Byway.

Demographics

Education
It is in Gallup-McKinley County Public Schools.

References 

Census-designated places in McKinley County, New Mexico
Census-designated places in New Mexico